Haudi Abdillah (born 20 April 1993) is an Indonesian professional footballer who plays as a centre-back for Liga 1 club Bali United.

Club career

Persibas Banyumas 
Haudi signed his first professional contract with Persibas Banyumas on 2011-2012 at Divisi I Liga Indonesia. In that season, Persibas Banyumas finished the 3rd position in first stage of Divisi I Liga Indonesia under Persika Karawang and Persibangga Purbalingga.

PSCS Cilacap 
Haudi Move to  PSCS Cilacap and spent 5 (five) seasons in there (2012 - 2016). His first goal for PSCS Cilacap he made when 2-1 victory over Pusamania Borneo F.C. in 2014 Liga Indonesia Premier Division clash on 23 October 2014 at Wijayakusuma Stadium. 
During the 2016, led PSCS Cilacap achieve Indonesia Soccer Championship B 2016 Winners. In the final match, Haudi scored 1 goal in the extra time and won 4-3 over PSS Sleman.

PSIS Semarang 
13 January 2017 Haudi joined PSIS Semarang, he was choose as captain in his first season and success led PSIS Semarang to promote to Liga 1.

Bali United 
On 12 January 2019, Haudi signed two years contract with Bali United for 2019 Liga 1. Haudi made his Bali United debut five months later on 30 June in a Liga 1 match against  Badak Lampung in a 3–0 away win. On 2 December 2019, Bali United won the championship for the first time in their history, becoming the seventh club to win the Liga 1 after second placed Borneo draw to PSM, followed by a win in Semen Padang, giving Bali United a 17-point lead with only four games left.

Honours

Club
PSCS Cilacap
 Indonesia Soccer Championship B: 2016
PSIS Semarang
 Liga 2 third place: 2017
Bali United
 Liga 1: 2019, 2021–22

References

External links
 
 Haudi Abdillah at Liga Indonesia

1993 births
Living people
Indonesian footballers
People from Semarang
Association football defenders
Liga 1 (Indonesia) players
Liga 2 (Indonesia) players
PSCS Cilacap players
PSIS Semarang players
Bali United F.C. players
Sportspeople from Central Java